Shahpur Jajan(Baba Budha Sahib Nagar) is a town in Gurdaspur district of Punjab State, India. The town is administrated by Sarpanch, an elected representative of the town. Shahpur Jajan is divided into four wards, each electing a sarpanch. These wards are Rampur, Shampur, Main Shahpur Jajan and Kila. Shahpur Jajan is also known as Shahpur Purbiyan. Gurdwara Sri Kothri Sahib is its main philosophical site here.

Demography 
, the town has a total number of 806 houses and a population of 4,374 of which 2,276 are males and 2,098 are females. According to Census of India in 2011, out of the total population of the town 335 people are from Schedule Caste and the town does not have any Scheduled Tribe population so far.

References

External links 
 Tourism of Punjab
 Census of Punjab

Villages in Gurdaspur district